The Paddock Hotel is a historic 110-room hotel building in Beatrice, Nebraska. It was built in 1924, and designed in the Renaissance Revival style by architect Thomas R. Kimball. According to its National Register of Historic Places Registration, "The entrance opens into a lobby with massive mahogany columns (now painted) rising from a mosaic tile floor to coffered ceilings at the second story. A marble staircase leads to the mezzanine area where decorative metal balustrades overlook the lobby." The hotel was turned into a retirement facility in 1970. It has been listed on the National Register of Historic Places since November 30, 1987.

References

		
National Register of Historic Places in Gage County, Nebraska
Renaissance Revival architecture in Nebraska
Hotel buildings completed in 1924